This is a list of the most expensive Nepali Films, with budgets given in Nepali rupees and US dollars.

Most expensive Nepali films

References

Lists of most expensive films
expensive